The alpine pipit (Anthus gutturalis) is a species of bird in the family Motacillidae. It is found in New Guinea.

References

alpine pipit
Birds of New Guinea
alpine pipit
Taxonomy articles created by Polbot